Karagöz is a Turkish word meaning "black eye" and may refer to:

 Burhan Karagöz (born 1929), Turkish businessman
 Nurdan Karagöz (born 1987), Turkish female weightlifter
 Karagöz and Hacivat, lead characters of the traditional Turkish shadow play, popularized during the Ottoman period
 Karagiozis, a shadow puppet and fictional character of Greek folklore
 Karagöz (magazine)
 Karagöz, Bismil
 Karagöz, Çorum
 Karagöz, Dursunbey, a village
 Karagöz, İskilip
 Karagöz, Karaçoban

Turkish-language surnames